Hunt Angels is a 2006 Australian docudrama, directed by Alec Morgan, starring Victoria Hill and Ben Mendelsohn. Hunt Angels was filmed in Sydney, Australia and opened in Australia on 30 November 2006 after premiering at the Melbourne International Film Festival in August.

Plot
In the late 1930s, Rupert Kathner and Alma Brooks began a movie-making spree that took on the Hollywood barons, a corrupt Police Commissioner and the cultural cringe, all in their passionate pursuit to make Australian films. On the run from police across thousands of miles, they would stop at almost nothing to get their films made.

Cast
Victoria Hill as Alma Brooks
Ben Mendelsohn as Rupert Kathner

Box office
Hunt Angels grossed $40,883 at the box office in Australia.

See also
Cinema of Australia

References

External links

Hunt Angels at the National Film and Sound Archive
Hunt Angels Official Movie Website

2006 films
2006 biographical drama films
Australian biographical drama films
Australian independent films
2006 independent films
2006 drama films
2000s English-language films
2000s Australian films